Franklin Parker (November 8, 1902 – June 12, 1962), also known as Frank Parker or Franklyn Parker, was an American character actor who appeared in over 100 films during his twenty-five year career. Born in Fillmore, Missouri on November 8, 1902, he began his show business career on the vaudeville and Broadway stages, where he proved himself an admirable singer. During those years he would often be billed as Pinky. His final screen performance was on television, on  The Donna Reed Show in 1961, where he was credited as Franklin Pinky Parker. His film career included appearances in such classic films as They Were Expendable, It's a Wonderful Life, Mr. Blandings Builds His Dream House, Mighty Joe Young, and Pat and Mike.  Occasionally he would have a larger role, such as the lead in the 1935 film, Sweet Surrender.  He died of a heart attack in Hollywood, California on June 12, 1962.

Filmography

(Per AFI database)

Millie (1931) as Spring
Two Seconds (1932) as Reporter
Behind Jury Doors (1932) as Casey
Honor of the Press (1932) as Sorrell Simpson
The All American (1932) - Radio announcer
Frisco Jenny (1933) as Martel
Blood Money (1933) as man in district attorney's office
Hell and High Water (1933) (uncredited)
The Past of Mary Holmes (1933) as Brooks
He Couldn't Take It (1933) as Radio announcer
Her Resale Value (1933) as Truex
Picture Brides (1933) as Bill
Operator 13 (1934) as John Hay
When Strangers Meet (1934) as Ed. Mason
Transatlantic Merry-Go-Round (1934) as Frank
Woman Unafraid (1934) as Henchman Randall
No More Women (1934) as Reporter
Chained (1934) as Third mate
I'll Tell the World (1934) as News editor
Romance in the Rain (1934) as Master of ceremonies
Let 'Em Have It (1935) as Mike
The Woman in Red (1935) as Reporter
It Happened in New York (1935) as Reporter
Sweet Surrender (1935) as Danny O'Day
Straight from the Heart (1935) as Reporter
Manhattan Moon (1935)
The Return of Jimmy Valentine (1936) as Grogan
Fury (1936) as Cameraman
The Preview Murder Mystery (1936) as Cutter
I'd Give My Life (1936) (uncredited)
Small Town Girl (1936) as Reporter
F-Man (1936) as Craig
Career Woman (1936) as Reporter—Clarkdale
Hollywood Boulevard (1936) as Workman—Brown Derby
Anything Goes (1936) as Reporter
Born to Dance (1936) as Reporter
Crash Donovan (1936) as Peanut vendor
The Gorgeous Hussy (1936) as Leader of mob
All American Chump (1936) as Photographer
Charlie Chan on Broadway (1937) as Reporter
Wells Fargo (1937) as Reporter
Angel's Holiday (1937) as Reporter
Night Club Scandal (1937) as Reporter
I Cover the War (1937) as Parker
Borrowing Trouble (1937) as Harris
True Confession (1937) as Reporter
Time Out for Romance (1937) as Reporter
Mr. Moto's Gamble (1938) as Reporter
Joy of Living (1938) as Producer
Too Hot to Handle (1938) as Attendant
Walking Down Broadway (1938) as Photographer
Give Me a Sailor (1938) as Reporter
The Higgins Family (1938) as Reynard
Trade Winds (1938) as Detective Squad member
Sinners in Paradise (1938) as Operator
Men with Wings (1938) as Mail truck driver
Cipher Bureau (1938) as Announcer
Young Dr. Kildare (1938) as Reporter
Eternally Yours (1939) as Croupier
Unmarried (1939) as Announcer
Invitation to Happiness (1939) as Reporter
The Man They Could Not Hang (1939) as Second reporter
The Spirit of Culver (1939) as Railroad ticket agent
Little Accident (1939) as Cameraman
Queen of the Mob (1940) as Filling station attendant
The Man Who Wouldn't Talk (1940) as Reporter
Harmon of Michigan (1941) as Bates
Lucky Legs (1942) as Real estate salesman
Corvette K-225 (1943) as Captain
The Good Fellows (1943) as Davis
Salute for Three (1943) as Radio official
The Impostor (1944) as Cashier
Follow the Boys (1944) as man in office
Ladies Courageous (1944) as Steward
Slightly Terrific (1944) as Marty
Three of a Kind (1944) as McGinty
Wilson (1944) as Reporter
Captain Eddie (1945) as Shelby
The Dolly Sisters (1945) as Reporter
I'll Tell the World (1945) as Character
See My Lawyer (1945) as Bailiff
Sunset in El Dorado (1945) as Conductor
They Were Expendable (1945) as Navy officer
The Blue Dahlia (1946) as Police stenographer
The Man Who Dared (1946) as Andy White
It's a Wonderful Life (1946) as Reporter (uncredited)
Blaze of Noon (1947) as Jenkins
Living in a Big Way (1947) as Reporter
Suddenly, It's Spring (1947) as Reporter
The Senator Was Indiscreet (1948) as Reporter
Good Sam (1948) as Photographer
Mickey (1948) as Cathy's father
Mr. Blandings Builds His Dream House (1948) as Simpson
On an Island with You (1948) as Lieutenant technical advisor
Abandoned (1949) as Plainclothesman
That Wonderful Urge (1949) as Reporter
Mighty Joe Young (1949) as Photographer
Tell It to the Judge (1949) as Outgoing reporter
The Undercover Man (1949) as Minor Role (uncredited)
Yes Sir, That's My Baby (1949) as State coach
The Jackpot (1950) as Poker player
Tales of the West 1 (1950) as Pete Green
Abbott and Costello Meet the Invisible Man (1951) as Photographer
Ace in the Hole (1951) as Reporter
All That I Have (1951) as Joe, Rewrite Man
Close to My Heart (1951) as Clerk
Come Fill the Cup (1951) as Bald man
Lightning Strikes Twice (1951) as Guard
Flesh and Fury (1952) as Inspector
The Narrow Margin (1952) as Telegraph attendant
Pat and Mike (1952)
Bugles in the Afternoon (1952) as Minor Role (uncredited)
The Mississippi Gambler (1953) as Bartender
Paris Follies of 1956 (1955) as himself

References

External links
 
 
 

Vaudeville performers
1902 births
1962 deaths
20th-century American male actors